Michaelangelo Christopher Blair (born November 26, 1974) is a former National Football League running back who played for the Cincinnati Bengals and Green Bay Packers in 1998.  His Bengal team career totaled three games, and he played 11 games for the Packers. Finishing his NFL career with 3 rushing attempts for 7 yards, and 3 catches for 20 yards. In 2001, he played for the New York/New Jersey Hitmen in the XFL. He also played for the Carolina Cobras in the Arena Football League.

Blair attended Ball State University, where he played on the 1996 Cardinals Las Vegas Bowl team.

In 2006 Blair played a football player in We Are Marshall starring Matthew McConaughey and The Game Plan starring Dwayne "Rock" Johnson. In 2007, he became a TJ or Travel Journalist for 5 Takes:Latin America on the Travel Channel.

Reference

External links

AFL stats

1974 births
Living people
Players of American football from Chicago
American football running backs
Ball State Cardinals football players
Cincinnati Bengals players
Green Bay Packers players
Frankfurt Galaxy players
New York/New Jersey Hitmen players
Grand Rapids Rampage players
Carolina Cobras players
New Orleans VooDoo players
New York Dragons players
High school football coaches in Illinois